The Roman Catholic Metropolitan Archdiocese of Philadelphia is a Latin Church ecclesiastical territory or diocese of the Catholic Church in southeastern Pennsylvania, in the United States. It covers the City and County of Philadelphia as well as Bucks, Chester, Delaware, and Montgomery counties. The diocese was erected by Pope Pius VII on April 8, 1808, from territories of the Archdiocese of Baltimore. Originally the diocese included all of Pennsylvania, Delaware, and seven counties and parts of three counties in New Jersey. The diocese was raised to the dignity of a metropolitan archdiocese on February 12, 1875. The seat of the archbishop is the Cathedral-Basilica of Ss. Peter & Paul. The Most Reverend Nelson J. Perez was appointed as Archbishop of Philadelphia in January 2020.

It is also the Metropolitan See of the Ecclesiastical Province of Philadelphia, which includes the suffragan episcopal sees of Allentown, Altoona-Johnstown, Erie, Greensburg, Harrisburg, Pittsburgh, and Scranton. The territory of the province is coextensive with the state of Pennsylvania.

History of the archdiocese

The history of the Catholic Church in the area dates back to William Penn and when Mass was said publicly as early as 1707. On April 8, 1808, the suffragan dioceses of Boston, New York, Philadelphia, and Bardstown (moved to Louisville in 1841) were erected by Pope Pius VII from the territory of the Diocese of Baltimore, which was simultaneously raised to the rank of metropolitan archdiocese. Michael Egan was appointed as the first bishop and was consecrated as a bishop on October 28, 1810, by Archbishop John Carroll.

In 1868, the dioceses of Harrisburg, Scranton, and Wilmington were erected from the territory of the diocese (the Wilmington diocese also received parts of Maryland and Virginia). Philadelphia was raised to a metropolitan archiepiscopal see on February 12, 1875, with Harrisburg and Scranton among its suffragan dioceses. On January 28, 1961, the five northern counties of Berks, Carbon, Lehigh, Northampton, and Schuylkill were split off from the archdiocese, to create the Diocese of Allentown.

By 1969, the archdiocese had grown to 1,351,704 parishioners, 1,096 diocesan priests, 676 priests of religious institutes and 6,622 religious women.

In February 2012, the diocese announced the largest reorganization of their elementary and high school education system, with numerous recommended school closings and/or mergers.

In a Thursday, August 23, 2012, online news story article about the Archdiocese's schools, Lou Baldwin of Catholic News Service (CNS) announced that the Faith in the Future Foundation would assume management of the seventeen archdiocesan high schools and the four special education schools.

Bishops

Bishops of Philadelphia
 Michael Francis Egan, O.F.M. (1808–1814)  (Ambrose Maréchal, P.S.S. appointed in 1816; did not take effect.)
 Henry Conwell (1819–1841)
 Francis Patrick Kenrick (1842–1851; coadjutor bishop 1830–1842), appointed Archbishop of Baltimore 
 Saint John Nepomucene Neumann, C.Ss.R. (1852–1860) 
 James Frederick Wood (1860–1875; coadjutor bishop 1857–1860), elevated to archbishop

Archbishops of Philadelphia

 James Frederick Wood (1875–1883)
 Patrick John Ryan (1884–1911)
 Edmond Francis Prendergast (1911–1918)
 Cardinal Dennis Joseph Dougherty (1918–1951)
 Cardinal John Francis O'Hara, C.S.C. (1951–1960)
 Cardinal John Joseph Krol (1961–1988)
 Cardinal Anthony Joseph Bevilacqua (1988–2003)
 Cardinal Justin Francis Rigali (2003–2011)
 Charles Joseph Chaput, O.F.M. Cap. (2011–2020)
 Nelson J. Perez (2020–present)

Current auxiliary bishops
 Timothy C. Senior (2009–present)
 John J. McIntyre (2010–present)
 Michael J. Fitzgerald (2010–present)

Former auxiliary bishops
 John Joseph McCort (1912–1920), appointed Coadjutor Bishop and later Bishop of Altoona
 Michael Joseph Crane (1921–1928)
 Gerald Patrick O'Hara (1929–1935), appointed Bishop of Savannah and later Apostolic Nuncio and Titular Archbishop
 Hugh L. Lamb (1935–1951), appointed Bishop of Greensburg
 J. Carroll McCormick (1947–1960), appointed Bishop of Altoona-Johnstown and later Bishop of Scranton
 Joseph Mark McShea (1952–1961), appointed Bishop of Allentown
 Cletus Joseph Benjamin (1960–1961)
 Francis James Furey (1960–1963), appointed Coadjutor Archbishop and later Archbishop of San Antonio
 Gerald Vincent McDevitt (1962–1980)
 John Joseph Graham (1963–1988)
 Thomas Jerome Welsh (1970–1974), appointed Bishop of Arlington and later Bishop of Allentown
 Martin Nicholas Lohmuller (1970–1994)
 Edward Thomas Hughes (1976–1986), appointed Bishop of Metuchen
 Francis B. Schulte (1981–1985), appointed Bishop of Wheeling-Charleston and later Archbishop of New Orleans
 Louis A. DeSimone (1981–1997)
 Edward Peter Cullen (1994–1997), appointed Bishop of Allentown
 Joseph Francis Martino (1996–2003), appointed Bishop of Scranton
 Robert P. Maginnis (1996–2010)
 Michael Francis Burbidge (2002–2006), appointed Bishop of Raleigh and later Bishop of Arlington
 Joseph R. Cistone (2004–2009), appointed Bishop of Saginaw
 Joseph P. McFadden (2004–2010), appointed Bishop of Harrisburg
 Daniel E. Thomas (2006–2014), appointed Bishop of Toledo
 Edward Michael Deliman (2016–2022)

Other living priests of this diocese who became bishops
Note: Year range in parentheses indicates the time of service as a priest of the (Arch)diocese of Philadelphia, prior to appointment to the episcopacy.

Edward Joseph Adams (1970–1996), appointed nuncio and titular archbishop
Herbert Bevard (1972–2008), appointed Bishop of St. Thomas
Michael Joseph Bransfield (1971–2004), appointed Bishop of Wheeling-Charleston
Joseph Lawrence Coffey (1996–2019), appointed auxiliary bishop of U.S. Military
James Patrick Green (1976–2006), appointed nuncio and titular archbishop
Joseph A. Pepe (1970–2001), appointed Bishop of Las Vegas
Nelson J. Perez (1989–2012), appointed auxiliary bishop of Rockville Centre; appointed Archbishop of Philadelphia in 2020

Other deceased priests of this diocese who became bishops
Note: Year range in parentheses indicates the time of service as a priest of the (Arch)diocese of Philadelphia, prior to appointment to the episcopacy.
Francis Brennan (1920–1940), appointed official of the Roman Rota; appointed titular archbishop and Cardinal in 1967
Edwin Byrne (1915–1925), appointed Bishop of Ponce
George Aloysius Carrell, SJ (ordained 1827; Philadelphia native but not priest of this diocese), appointed Bishop of Covington in 1853
James Jordan Carroll (1889–1908), appointed Bishop of Nueva Segovia, Philippines
Hubert James Cartwright (1927–1956), appointed Coadjutor Bishop of Wilmington
Joseph M. Corrigan (1903–1940), appointed titular bishop
Joseph Thomas Daley (1941–1963), appointed auxiliary bishop of Harrisburg
Francis Xavier DiLorenzo (1968–1988), appointed auxiliary bishop of Scranton
Dennis Joseph Dougherty (1890–1903), appointed Bishop of Nueva Segovia, Philippines; appointed Archbishop of Philadelphia in 1918 (Cardinal in 1921)
Edmond John Fitzmaurice (1904–1925), appointed Bishop of Wilmington
John Edmund Fitzmaurice (1862–1897), appointed Coadjutor Bishop of Erie
John Patrick Foley (1962–1984), appointed titular archbishop (Cardinal in 2007)
Joseph Anthony Galante (1964–1992), appointed auxiliary bishop of San Antonio
Francis Xavier Gartland (1832–1850), appointed Bishop of Savannah
Daniel James Gercke (1901–1923), appointed Bishop of Tucson
Ignatius Frederick Horstmann (1865–1891), appointed Bishop of Cleveland
John Joseph Hughes (1826–1837), appointed Coadjutor Bishop of New York
Francis Edward Hyland (1927–1949), appointed auxiliary bishop of Savannah-Atlanta
Thomas Francis Kennedy (1887–1907), appointed titular bishop
James Paul McCloskey (1898–1917), appointed Bishop of Zamboanga, Philippines
Philip R. McDevitt (1885–1916), appointed Bishop of Harrisburg
Thomas Joseph McDonough (1938–1947), appointed auxiliary bishop of St. Augustine
Thomas McGovern (1861–1888), appointed Bishop of Harrisburg
Eugene J. McGuinness (1915–1937), appointed Bishop of Raleigh
John Joseph O'Connor (1945–1979), appointed auxiliary bishop of U.S. military; future Cardinal
William O'Hara (1842–1868), appointed Bishop of Scranton
Jeremiah F. Shanahan (1859–1868), appointed Bishop of Harrisburg
John W. Shanahan (1869–1899), appointed Bishop of Harrisburg
David B. Thompson (1950–1961), appointed Coadjutor Bishop of Charleston in 1989

Churches

Educational institutions

Circa 1912 there were about 68,000 students in Catholic schools within the archdiocesan territory. This increased to 250,000 in 1961, but the figures decreased after that year. Enrollment was down to 68,000 in 2012. There were about 50,000 students in Catholic schools in the city of Philadelphia in 2000, and this figure decreased to 30,000 in 2010. In that span one Catholic high school and 23 Catholic elementary schools closed or merged, and the proliferation of charter schools in that period meant that the number of students combined in that type of school  outnumbered that of the remaining Philadelphia Catholic schools.

In 2012 the archdiocese proposed closing or merging 18 schools in Philadelphia and 31 schools outside of Philadelphia; the Philadelphia Inquirer stated this would further weaken Philadelphia's middle class. The proposal would affect 24% and 29% of the senior high and K-8 schools, respectively.

Elementary schools
 (only includes schools notable for their own Wikipedia articles)
The first Catholic school established in the Archdiocese of Philadelphia was at St. Mary Parish in Philadelphia during the late eighteenth century. During the nineteenth century, Bishop Kenrick encouraged the establishment of Catholic schools. Subsequently, St. John Neumann (1851–1860) made the establishment of parish elementary schools a priority and by 1860 there were seventeen parish elementary schools in Philadelphia.  Between 1900 and 1930, Catholic elementary schools increased to 124 schools in Philadelphia and 78 schools in the four suburban counties. Between 1945 and 1965, 62 new Catholic elementary schools were established.

In 2012, about 25% of the students in Philadelphia Catholic elementary schools were not Catholic. In 2010 South Philadelphia Catholic elementary schools had 2,572 students, a decline by 27% from the 2006 figure.

Special Needs schools
With the foundation of Archbishop Ryan School for Children with Deafness in 1912, the Archdiocese of Philadelphia school system began serving families of children with special needs.  St. Katherine Day School and Our Lady of Confidence School, serving students with mental retardation, were opened in 1953 and 1954 respectively, after parent petitions to John Cardinal O'Hara. St. Lucy Day School for Children with Visual Impairment followed in 1955. Queen of the Universe Day Center was added in 1980 to serve students with mental retardation in Bucks County. These five schools are supported by the Catholic Charities Appeal.

High schools within the archdiocese

Diocesan high schools
Leadership within the Archdiocese of Philadelphia envisioned a continued comprehensive education for secondary students.

The first free Catholic high school in the United States was the "Roman Catholic High School of Philadelphia", founded for the education of boys in 1890. (It is often referred to as "Roman Catholic", occasionally as "Catholic High", and most commonly as "Roman".) The "Catholic Girls High School" was founded in 1912. Mary McMichan, one of the school's founders, requested in her last will that the school be renamed in honor of her brother.  The school became "John W. Hallahan Catholic Girls High School" after her death. Both schools are still in existence.

Between 1916 and 1927 West Catholic Boys and Girls and Northeast Catholic were opened. Despite the economic hardships of the 1930s and 1940s, seven more diocesan high schools were founded. During a 22-year growth period from 1945 to 1967, fifteen high schools were opened.

Seminaries
St. Charles Borromeo Seminary
Redemptois Mater Archdiocesan Missionary Seminary

Colleges and universities within the archdiocese
Note: Each Catholic college and university within the archdiocese is affiliated with a religious institute, rather than the Archdiocese of Philadelphia.
Alvernia University - Philadelphia Center (branch campus), Cheltenham Township (Bernardine Sisters of St. Francis)
Cabrini University, Radnor Township (Missionary Sisters of the Sacred Heart of Jesus)
Chestnut Hill College, Philadelphia (Sisters of Saint Joseph)
Gwynedd Mercy University, Lower Gwynedd Township (Sisters of Mercy)
Holy Family University, Philadelphia (Sisters of the Holy Family of Nazareth)
Immaculata University, East Whiteland Township (Sisters, Servants of the Immaculate Heart of Mary)
La Salle University, Philadelphia (Christian Brothers)
Neumann University, Aston Township (Sisters of St. Francis of Philadelphia)
Rosemont College, Lower Merion Township (Society of the Holy Child Jesus)
Saint Joseph's University, Philadelphia (Jesuits)
Villanova University, Radnor Township (Augustinians)

Catholic Social Services 
The Archdiocese has had a foster care agency for more than 100 years. It sued Philadelphia after the city stopped referring foster care cases to the agency after it refused to use same-sex couples to foster children. The case went to the Supreme Court with the name Fulton v. City of Philadelphia, Pa

Controversies

Sexual abuse scandals

The Philadelphia abuses were substantially revealed through a grand jury investigation in 2005. Cardinal Justin Francis Rigali adopted the policy of laicizing those who were accused and confirmed by investigations. A second grand jury in 2011 said that as many as 37 priests were credibly accused of sexual abuse or inappropriate behavior toward minors. In 2012, a guilty plea by priest Edward Avery and the related trial and conviction of Monsignor William Lynn and mistrial on charges against Rev. James J. Brennan followed from the grand jury's investigations. In 2013, Rev. Charles Engelhardt and teacher Bernard Shero were tried, convicted and sentenced to prison. Lynn was the first official to be convicted in the United States of covering up abuses by other priests in his charge and other senior church officials have been extensively criticized for their management of the issue in the archdiocese.

On March 12, 2020, a new trial date was official set for Lynn, who was released and ordered to be retried in 2016 after serving 33 months of his sentence, with jury selection to start March 16. However, the ongoing coronavirus pandemic forced Lynn's retrial to be delayed until January 2021. Following his release from prison in 2016, Lynn was ordered to remain on supervised parole until his retrial. In 2019, it was reported that the 2011 grand jury report also resulted in Lynn being suspended from ministry.

On May 5, 2020, Archdiocese of Philadelphia announced that it now expected to pay $126 million in reparations. The archdiocese also said its Independent Reconciliation and Reparations Program, which was established in 2018, has received a total of 615 claims, and had settled 208 of them for $43.8 million as of April 22, 2020. That averages out to about $211,000 per claim, which is in line with what other dioceses have been paying under similar programs. The same day, however, the total number of money which the Archdiocese of Philadelphia expects to pay in sex abuse settlements was soon revised to $130 million by Archbishop of Philadelphia Nelson J. Perez. On August 14, 2020, it was revealed that the Archdiocese of Philadelphia and its suffragan dioceses of Pittsburgh, Allentown and Scranton were enduring the bulk of 150 new lawsuits filed against all eight Pennsylvania Catholic dioceses.

On December 3, 2020, William McCandless, a member of the Wilmington-based religious order Oblates de St. Francis De Sales who was formerly assigned to DeSales University in Lehigh County, was charged in Philadelphia for possession of child pornography.  Grace Kelly, the late mother of Monaco's leader Prince Albert, was also a native of Philadelphia. Much of McCandless' child pornography was imported from overseas as well. McCandless has been ordered to remain under house arrest until the outcome of his trial.

Firing of Margie Winters for same-sex marriage

In 2015, it was reported that the school's director of religious education, Margie Winters, had been fired from the Waldron Mercy Academy after a parent had reported her directly to the Archdiocese of Philadelphia for marrying her long-term lesbian partner in a civil ceremony in 2007. Winters had been upfront with school administrators at the time of her hiring and was advised to keep a low profile which she says she did. Many parents expressed anger and concern over the school's decision. Principal Nell Stetser justified the decision by arguing that "many of us accept life choices that contradict current Church teachings, but to continue as a Catholic school, Waldron Mercy must comply with those teachings." But she called for "an open and honest discussion about this and other divisive issues at the intersection of our society and our Church." The Archbishop of Philadelphia, Charles Chaput, called the dismissal "common sense."

Saints of Philadelphia
St. Frances Xavier Cabrini, for whom the suburban college is named and who visited on numerous occasions. She started an orphanage and an Italian national parish that still is functioning today, St. Donato's in West Philadelphia.
St. Katharine Drexel
St. John Nepomucene Neumann – A Redemptorist; became the fourth Bishop of Philadelphia (1852–60) and the first U.S. bishop to be canonized; as bishop of Philadelphia, he founded the first Catholic diocesan school system in the U.S.

Shrines of Philadelphia

Basilica Shrine of Our Lady of the Miraculous Medal
National Shrine of Our Lady of Czestochowa
National Shrine of Saint John Neumann
Saint Katharine Drexel Mission Center and Shrine
National Shrine of Saint Rita of Cascia

Publications
 The Catholic Standard & Times (former newspaper)
 CatholicPhilly.com (online news site)

See also

 Catholic Church and politics in the United States
 Catholic Church by country
 Catholic Church in the United States
 Connelly Foundation
 Ecclesiastical Province of Philadelphia
 Global organisation of the Catholic Church
 History of Roman Catholicism in the United States
 List of Roman Catholic archdioceses (by country and continent)
 List of Roman Catholic dioceses (alphabetical) (including archdioceses)
 List of Roman Catholic dioceses (structured view) (including archdioceses)
 List of the Catholic cathedrals of the United States
 List of the Catholic dioceses of the United States
 Philadelphia Nativist Riots
 Plenary Councils of Baltimore
 Polish Cathedral style
 LT Robert R. Brett, S.M., Chaplain, USN – Chaplain killed during Vietnam War.
 Roman Catholicism in the United States
 Ukrainian Catholic Archeparchy of Philadelphia, other Catholic archdiocese-level province based in Philadelphia

References

External links
 Roman Catholic Archdiocese of Philadelphia Official Site
 
 Office of Catholic Education 
 

 
Christianity in Philadelphia
Religious organizations established in 1808
Philadelphia
Philadelphia
1808 establishments in Pennsylvania